Lakehurst Mall was a shopping mall in Waukegan, Illinois, a suburb of Chicago, Illinois, United States. The mall officially opened in 1971. The mall's anchor stores were JCPenney, Wieboldt's, and Carson Pirie Scott. After Wieboldt's closed in 1986, its former location was divided between Montgomery Ward and Dunham's Sports. The mall declined in the 1990s, closed in 2001, and was demolished in 2004.

Beginning 
In December 1968,  of farmland close to the Tri-State Tollway was purchased from Thomas E. Wilson/Edellyn Farms for $2 million, and annexed into Waukegan, Illinois. Construction on the mall began about one year later, in September 1969. A five-year research project of Lake County had concluded that Lake County would be one of the fastest developing areas of the Midwest. The mall was designed by Sidney H. Morris and Associates of Chicago and Gruen Associates of Los Angeles; Initially, Arthur Rubloff & Co. of Chicago was the management and leasing agent for Lakehurst.

The new 1.1 million square feet (102,000 m²) mall officially opened on August 19, 1971. Over 5,000 people attended the opening day ceremonies, including the mayor of Waukegan. Original anchor stores of the mall were JCPenney, Carson Pirie Scott, and Wieboldt's. 85 percent of the center had been leased by 1970. Other major tenants included Henry C. Lytton & Co., Chas. A. Stevens, and Hein's department stores, the latter of which also had a location in downtown Waukegan.

Outparcels of the mall site were developed into the General Cinema Lakehurst 12 movie theatre (which opened in 1974) and restaurants such as Red Lobster. An apartment complex with over 200 rental units was completed by the mid-1970s.

1980s 
A Marriott hotel was added to the area, and Pier 1 Imports and Service Merchandise were built on outparcels.

Jacobs, Visconsi, and Jacobs, of Cleveland, Ohio bought the general areas of the mall. In August 1986, the Wieboldt's anchor went out of business, prior to the eventual closure of the entire chain. The company sold their location to the Jacobs Group, who temporarily used the space for classrooms after two of the three elementary schools in Gurnee, Illinois were destroyed in floods. After this, the former location of Wieboldt's was subdivided between Dunham's Sports on the lower level and Montgomery Ward on the upper level. The Montgomery Ward store had previously been located in the Belvidere Mall a few miles down Route 120.

1990s 
On August 8, 1991, Gurnee Mills opened seven miles (11 km) away from Lakehurst.  The newer, larger Gurnee Mills proved a much larger draw than expected, devastating Lakehurst's retail base.

The mall had 100 tenants at the beginning of the 1990s, but by 1997, about fifty businesses remained. In early 1998, both Montgomery Ward and JCPenney pulled out of Lakehurst, leaving Carson Pirie Scott as the sole anchor. The Jacobs Group sold Lakehurst in the summer of 1998; the price was $30 million, a little less than that of the sale price in 1982.

2000s 
Fewer than five tenants remained by 2000. These included the Gift Tree and Barbary Coast stores in the mall, as well as the Carson Pirie Scott anchor. When the leases on the two mall stores ended on January 31, 2001, most of the mall was shuttered, and only Carson's was in operation. During the mall's final days, a portion of the film "5-25-77" was filmed inside the former KB Toys building.

Demolition 

Ownership changed from the Jacobs Group to the Shaw Company of Oak Brook, Illinois. A phased demolition began near the JCPenney store in November 2003. Carson's stayed open for the Christmas season and closed on January 15, 2004. Demolition of the JCPenney section was completed February 2004, followed by the Wieboldt's/Montgomery Ward section, then the Carson's section, and ended with the gazebo of the Wieboldts anchor, which had outlasted the anchor. A Walmart supercenter was built on the northern part of the property, while the southern portion remains largely undeveloped. Part of the street encircling the property still retains the name "Lakehurst Road".

References

External links 

 DeadMalls.com on Lakehurst Mall

1971 establishments in Illinois
2004 disestablishments in Illinois
Buildings and structures demolished in 2004
Demolished shopping malls in the United States
Shopping malls established in 1971
Shopping malls in Lake County, Illinois
Waukegan, Illinois
Victor Gruen buildings